Gregory James Alan Milward (born 17 December 1985) is an English radio and television presenter and author. He hosts BBC Radio 1's breakfast show, co-presents the cricket podcast Tailenders alongside Felix White and James Anderson, and wrote the Kid Normal book series alongside Chris Smith.

Early life
James was born to Alan and Rosemary Milward on 17 December 1985 in Lewisham, London. His parents were both teachers; Alan a headteacher, and Rosemary a special-needs teacher. He has one sister, Catherine. As a baby, he received three life-saving blood transfusions and was in an incubator for a week.

James used to play cricket for Hertfordshire Under-18s.

James first broadcast on hospital radio aged 14, however, he later discovered that the transmitter was broken and none of his shows actually went out.

James is an alumnus of The Bishop's Stortford High School, where he was deputy head boy. He studied drama at the University of East Anglia in Norwich and achieved a 2:1. At university he lived with comedians John Kearns and Pat Cahill.

Career

Radio
While at university, he presented several shows on the students' union radio station Livewire 1350AM, becoming the station manager in 2006. He later said that being station manager was a job he did not enjoy. He also presented several breakfast shows on Future Radio in Norwich and also on Pulse Rated in Salhouse before he got his break at BBC Radio 1. He won 'Best Male Presenter' at the Student Radio Awards 2005. During university holidays he presented stints on Galaxy North East.

James joined BBC Radio 1 in June 2007 to present Early Breakfast on Friday and cover for other presenters such as Sara Cox and Vernon Kay. He presented his first show on Friday 1 June 2007, the day after graduating from university. In October 2007, he was awarded the Early Breakfast Show (4:30am7am, which was soon changed to 4am6:30am) five days a week. He presented his first full-time show on Monday 1 October 2007, and his first ever Record of the Week was Hometown Glory by Adele.

On 21 September 2009, a new schedule was launched on Radio 1, and it was announced that James would move to an early afternoon slot – 1pm to 4pm - replacing Edith Bowman, who moved to the weekend breakfast slot.

James was the host of The Official Chart Update, on Wednesday afternoons between 3:30pm and 4pm, and 4pm to 4:30pm when he moved to drivetime, from its inception in March 2010 until January 2013 when Scott Mills took it over, at the original time of 3:30pm.

James also co-hosts Not Just Cricket on 5 Live with England cricketers Graeme Swann and James Anderson that is broadcast once every few months. The show's main focus is cricket, but topics are varied.

He also hosts the weekly podcast That's What He Said with BBC Radio 1 Newsbeat presenter Chris Smith. The podcast features the best bits of James' show each week, guest interviews, and special bonus content just for the podcast. Greg and Chris play 'Cheeseball' each week -  a game which involves throwing Babybell into the centre of a cheese 'court' and the closest to the centre wins. The pair also do birthday, engagement, and wedding announcements to the theme of Jurassic Park. Each podcast also comes with an e-mail from Julia from Germany - the show clerk - who provides the pair with a weekly agenda. More recent podcast features include 'Friendly Foreigners', 'Julia's word of the week' and 'Dr. Tiny's Science fact'.

James guest hosted the edition of 16 February 2013 of the 5 Live comedy sport programme Fighting Talk, standing in for Colin Murray.

On 15 November 2017, James along with Felix White, Jimmy Anderson, faded up producer Mark 'Sharky' Sharman (AKA Sharknado the Movie), and regular input from Bristolian Matt ‘Mattchin’ Horan began hosting a cricketing podcast Tailenders. This was initially a weekly podcast covering the 2017–18 Ashes series,  since 23 May 2018 it was renewed to continue on a 'weekly' basis. Features include 'General Cricketing Sadness', 'Mattchin's Quiz' and 'Black Wednesday/Xmas Show/App Launch'.

Since 2019, James has also presented the BBC Radio 4 series Rewinder, a show where he digs through the BBC archives to find classic stuff to reflect on current stories of the week.

Drivetime

On 28 February 2012, it was announced that James and Scott Mills would swap shows as of 2 April 2012, meaning James would host the drivetime show (1600-1900) from that date. James's show had a variety of recurring features including: "The 10 Minute Takeover" (Mon-Thurs 1800), "Impossible Karaoke", "Rage against the Answer Machine", "Mayor of Where", "Ask The Nation", "Wrong Uns", "What's My Age Again" prior to "The Official Chart" moving to Fridays, celebrity guests on Thursdays, and Film Reviews with reviewer Ali Plumb. Off the cuff improv games typically include Chris Smith aka: 'Chris Smith with the news' the main afternoon Newsbeat reader.

James once hosted his show for an entire week broadcasting from the BFBS radio studio in Camp Bastion, Afghanistan; he also staged "G In the Park", a mini-music festival from the BBC in Glasgow prior to the T in the Park festival.

Due to changes in release dates of music worldwide, since 10 July 2015 James' former Friday show was taken up by The Official Chart between 1600 and 1745, followed by Dance Anthems between 1800 and 1900.

The drive time show is traditionally split into two halves, with a fifteen-minute break between 1745 and 1800 for the evening Newsbeat broadcast.

On 19 June 2017, James chose the name "RoboCrop" from "thousands and thousands" of listeners' suggestions for a tractor on loan to Dorset Police to tour agricultural shows to raise awareness of rural crime.

Radio 1 Breakfast
On 20 August 2018, James took over Radio 1 Breakfast from Nick Grimshaw. The pair switched shows, with Grimshaw taking on the Drivetime show from 4pm – 7pm. It was announced by the two presenters on Grimshaw's Breakfast Show on 31 May, with Grimshaw joking "It's time for a change, time for a new show and, most importantly, it's going to be time for a new wake-up time... preferably around 11:30am". Both presenters were very excited about the change, with James saying that taking over would be a "big challenge" but he was ready and willing "to give it a go". His first guest on the show was Wallace the Lion from Blackpool Zoo. The show was broadcast four days a week, until December 2020 when the BBC announced changes to the Radio 1 schedule, with James' Breakfast Show now being five days a week, whilst Matt Edmondson and Mollie King moved from the weekend breakfast show to the weekend afternoon slot.

Television
James is also a TV presenter. In 2009, he presented a TV show for BBC Three called Sun, Sex and Holiday Madness, about British tourists in Magaluf and Young, Jobless and Living at Home, also for BBC Three. He has presented Sound on BBC Two's Switch and he hosted the backstage winners' podium at the 2009 BRIT Awards, which he did again in 2010.

In 2011, James had a non-speaking cameo role in the Doctor Who episode "Closing Time".

James presented the BBC Three's coverage of Glastonbury Festival 2011 and in August 2012, the Reading and Leeds Festival (both with Fearne Cotton). He presented coverage of T in the Park 2012, alongside Edith Bowman in July. In 2013, James co-presented extensive coverage of Radio 1's Big Weekend on BBC Three with Alice Levine. In June 2013, James once again hosted BBC Three's coverage of Glastonbury, alongside Gemma Cairney.

He again hosted the BBC's coverage of festivals including Radio 1's Big Weekend, T in The Park, Reading, and Glastonbury in the summer of 2014.

In 2012, James co-presented two series of Unzipped (originally named Britain Unzipped) on BBC Three with Russell Kane and later How to Win Eurovision, a special two-hour show, on 11 May 2013. In December 2012, James and Gabby Logan presented 50 Greatest London 2012 Olympics Moments on BBC Three. The show was broadcast on his 27th birthday.

On 25 September 2013, James along with Kane starred in their chat show Staying in with Greg and Russell on BBC Three. Both later appeared on the Children in Need 2013 appeal night during a Lip Sync Challenge, which James won by performing "Circle of Life" from The Lion King.

In 2014, James appeared as a contestant in the CBeebies gameshow Swashbuckle with his niece Pia.

In September 2014, James hosted the closing ceremony of The Invictus Games with Clare Balding live on BBC Two. In 2015, he presented the BBC Three reality game show I Survived a Zombie Apocalypse.

In May 2015, he played a police officer in the BBC Three comedy murder mystery series Murder in Successville. Also in 2015, James co-wrote and starred in the Comedy Feeds episode Dead Air.

In March 2016, he hosted a segment of the Sport Relief telethon with Alesha Dixon. James has guest presented several episodes of The One Show.

In November 2016, James co-presented the BBC's Children in Need appeal for the first time. He also presented the Children in Need Rocks for Terry concert at the Royal Albert Hall with Fearne Cotton.

Between 2016 and 2017, Greg presented BT Sport's cricket coverage of the South Africa tour to Australia.

In 2017 and 2018, he co-presented the primetime BBC One music show Sounds Like Friday Night with A.Dot. The show wasn't renewed for a third series.

In 2022, James became an executive producer for the Sky documentary series The Man Who Bought Cricket, focusing on billionaire and fraudster Allen Stanford. It was based on a BBC Sounds podcast presented by James on the same subject, in a series called Sport's Strangest Crimes.

In March 2023, Channel 4 announced that James would be the host of its new reality show Rise and Fall.

Kid Normal
Together with newsreader Chris Smith, James wrote the children's book series Kid Normal which is a 6-book series about a normal boy in a superhero world. The first one was published by Bloomsbury and released on 13 July 2017 in the UK and the second one the following March. The first book was the biggest selling children's debut of the year and have sold over 100,000 copies combined. The books have also been released in 19 other languages around the world.

Charity work
In January 2013, along with Jack Dee, Melanie C, Dara Ó Briain, Philips Idowu and Chelsee Healey, James took part in Comic Relief: Through Hell and High Water. They journeyed along the Zambezi River for 5 days raising money to build a new school in the region. They raised well over £1 million for the charity.

On 2 March 2013, James appeared on the Let's Dance for Comic Relief judging panel alongside Arlene Phillips and Lee Mack.

In 2014, James was part of 'Team Coe' in the Sport Relief: Clash of the Titans. His team won the competition held at the Queen Elizabeth Olympic Park.  He took part in the cycling, synchronized swimming and swimming relay.

In February 2015, he, Chris Smith, Yasmin Evans and Alex Jones traveled to Uganda to take part in Operation Health. There, they helped to rebuild the Iyolwa Health Centre in Eastern Uganda, using money raised by Comic Relief. He blogged about it here.  In total, the Radio 1 audience raised £551,405.

In February 2016, for Sport Relief, James underwent the tough challenge, dubbed the 'Gregathlon', of completing five Triathlons in 5 days, in 5 different cities across the UK, hosting his Drivetime Radio 1 show after completing his daily Triathlon, raising £1 million for charity.

In February 2018, James undertook his second Gregathlon for Sport Relief: Pedal to the Peaks. He returned to complete the challenge and climbed Ben Nevis on 16 March 2018, raising over £1 million.

Personal life
James is godfather to Ruby, the youngest daughter of England cricketer James Anderson.

He is a keen cricket fan, and used to play for Hertfordshire Under-18s. He is also a keen supporter of Aviva Premiership Rugby Club Bath Rugby. He is also a football fan and supports Arsenal.

James lived with comedians Pat Cahill and John Kearns at university.

He is an ambassador for two charities; The Stroke Association and The Lord's Taverners. He also took part in the 2012 NHS Team Give Blood campaign, representing O+.

On 1 June 2018, James announced his engagement to his girlfriend Bella Mackie, the daughter of newspaper editor Alan Rusbridger and the author of bestselling dark novel How to Kill Your Family. They married in September of the same year. They live in London.

Awards
 2005 – Student Radio Award for 'Best Male Presenter'
 2013 – 'Loaded Lafta' for 'Funniest Radio Show'
 2013 – Silver Sony Radio Academy Award for 'Best Entertainment Show'
 2014 – Gold Radio Academy Award for 'Best Entertainment Show'
 2016 – Gold Radio Academy 'ARIA' Award for 'Best Entertainment Production'
 2020 – Arias Award for 'Best New Show'
 2020 – Arias Award for 'Best marketing campaign'
 2020 – TRIC awards for " Radio Personality"

Filmography

Guest appearances

 The Gadget Show (2009)
 The Wright Stuff (2011)
 South Today (2012)
Celebrity Juice (2012, 2013)
What's Cooking? (2013)
50 Funniest Moments of 2013 (2013)
The Apprentice: You're Fired! (2014, 2015)
BBC Radio 1 Teen Awards (2014)
Pointless Celebrities (2015)
 The 15 Second Interview with Joe Lycett (2015)
BBC Music Awards (2015)
Frank Skinner on Demand with... (2015)
Murder In Successville (2015)
Drunk History (2016)
Room 101 (2016)
Lorraine (2016, 2017, 2018, 2019)
Weekend (2017)
Victoria Derbyshire (2017)
Saturday Kitchen (2017, 2020)
Saturday Mash-Up! (2017)
The One Show (2017, 2020, 2021)
Zoe Ball On... (2018)
BBC Breakfast (2018, 2019)
This Morning (2018, 2019, 2022)
The Sara Cox Show (2019)
Would I Lie to You? (2019)
Loose Women (2019)
Ant & Dec's Saturday Night Takeaway (2020, 2022)
Sport Relief (2020)
The Big Night In (2020)
Great British Menu (2020)
Michael Palin: Travels of a Lifetime (2020)
Morning Live (2020)
Strictly Come Dancing (2020)
ITV News Central (2021)
Between the Covers (2021)
The Great Garden Revolution (2022)
Celebrity Masterchef (2022)
QI (2022)

References

External links

Radio 1 Breakfast with Greg James (BBC Radio 1)
Radio 1 Anthems (BBC Radio 1)

1985 births
Living people
Alumni of the Student Radio Association
Alumni of the University of East Anglia
BBC Radio 1 presenters
BBC Radio 4 presenters
BBC television presenters
BT Sport presenters and reporters
English radio personalities
English television presenters
People from Lewisham
Television personalities from London